Aniruddha Guha is an Indian screenwriter of Hindi films, a podcaster, and a host. He is a former journalist and film critic who contributed to leading publications like DNA, The Hindu, Firstpost and Mumbai Mirror. His screenwriting credits include P.O.W. - Bandi Yuddh Ke, Malang and Rashmi Rocket. At the 67th Filmfare Awards, Guha got a nomination in the category of Best Screenplay for the film Rashmi Rocket.

Career 
Guha started his career as a journalist in 2007 at the newspaper, DNA (Daily News & Analysis), where he reviewed films. Later, he joined Time Out (Mumbai) magazine as Editor, Film. In addition, Guha has written columns for publications like Mumbai Mirror, The Hindu, Firstpost, and MensXP.

In 2016, Guha made his debut as a screenwriter with the political thriller series P.O.W. - Bandi Yuddh Ke, an official adaptation of Gideon Raff’s Hatufim (earlier adapted as Homeland in the US). The critically-acclaimed series, directed by Nikkhil Advani, won Best Asian Show at the Seoul International Awards, and Best Drama (Jury) at the Indian Television Academy awards. For his work on the show, Guha got nominated for Best Teleplay at the Indian Television Academy awards.

His next as screenwriter, the action thriller film Malang, released in 2020 and was a box office hit. Bollywood Hungama, in its 3.5 star review of Malang, said: “Aniruddha Guha's screenplay ensures most scenes don’t give a strong déjà vu of any film. There’s a lot happening in the film and the script is written in such a way that it does not bore the audience”. For IANS, critic Vinayak Chakravorty wrote that while the core idea may sound cliched, “Aniruddha Guha’s screenplay maintains suspense by opting for a parallel narrative structure". The same year, Guha worked as a story consultant on the show, Code M, a military procedural.

In 2021, he wrote the screenplay and additional dialogues of the sports drama film Rashmi Rocket, directed by Akarsh Khurana, released on the streaming platform, ZEE 5, on October 15th. Ronak Kotecha of The Times of India gave Rashmi Rocket four stars and said, “Nanda Periyasamy’s riveting story, Aniruddha Guha’s sharp screenplay and Akarsh Khurana’s able direction, holds your attention right from the beginning until the end, where the race for justice is played out in a court.” In her review for The Quint, film critic Stutee Ghosh gave the film 3.5 stars, and said, “Director Akarsh Khurana and screenplay writer Aniruddha Guha seem to have made a conscious choice to keep the tone upbeat and that works in favour of the film.” In her review for Mashable, Sushri Saha wrote, "With strong performances led by Pannu and a well-written screenplay, the film does justice to the issues it raises and challenges.”

In an interview in November 2021, Guha said he was working on four shows. Among them, one would be directed by Vishnuvardhan for producer Siddharth Roy Kapur, while another was an official adaptation of an Israeli series. Guha has also written the second season of Code M, slated to release in early 2022.

In addition to his screenwriting work, Guha has also hosted two podcasts, ‘Watcha! with AniGuha’, and ‘Mr & Mrs Bingewatch’, where he recommended films and shows to watch.

In September 2021, Guha was announced as one of the winners of Clubhouse’s Creator First programme in India. Guha runs The Bollywood Film Club, under which he hosts two programmes, Inside The Writers’ Room, and In The Club, on Clubhouse.

Personal life 
He is the grandson of noted filmmaker Dulal Guha.

Filmography

References 

Living people
Indian male screenwriters
Indian film critics
Indian journalists
1985 births